Pleš is a former settlement in the Municipality of Dolenjske Toplice in southern Slovenia. The area is part of the traditional region of Lower Carniola and is now included in the Southeast Slovenia Statistical Region. Its territory is now part of the village of Dobindol.

History
Pleš was a Gottschee German village. Two houses in the village were burned by Italian troops during the Second World War.

References

External links
 Pleš on Geopedia
Pre–World War II map of Pleš with oeconyms and family names

Former populated places in the Municipality of Dolenjske Toplice